Corvée is a form of unpaid, forced labour, that is intermittent in nature lasting for limited periods of time: typically for only a certain number of days' work each year.

Statute labour is a corvée imposed by a state for the purposes of public works. As such it represents a form of levy (taxation). Unlike other forms of levy, such as a tithe, a corvée does not require the population to have land, crops or cash.

The obligation for tenant farmers to perform corvée work for landlords on private landed estates was widespread throughout history before the Industrial Revolution. The term is most typically used in reference to medieval and early modern Europe, where work was often expected by a feudal landowner (of their vassals), or by a monarch of their subjects. 

The application of the term is not limited to that time or place; the corvée has existed in modern and ancient Egypt, ancient Sumer, ancient Rome, China, Japan, everywhere in continental Europe, the Incan civilization, Haiti under Henry I and under American occupation (1915–1934), and Portugal's African colonies until the mid-1960s. Forms of statute labour officially existed until the early twentieth century in Canada and the United States.

Etymology
The word corvée itself has its origins in Rome, and reached the English language via France. In the Later Roman Empire the citizens performed opera publica in lieu of paying taxes; often it consisted of road and bridge work. Roman landlords could also demand a certain number of days' labour from their tenants, and also from the freedmen; in the latter case the work was called . In medieval Europe, the tasks that serfs or villeins were required to perform on a yearly basis for their lords were called . Plowing and harvesting were principal activities to which this applied. In times of need, the lord could demand additional work called  (Latin , 'to requisition'). This term evolved into , then , and finally corvée, and the meaning broadened to encompass both the regular and exceptional tasks. 

The medieval agricultural corvée was not entirely unpaid: by custom the workers could expect small payments, often in the form of food and drink consumed on the spot. Corvée sometimes included military conscription, and the term is also occasionally used in a slightly divergent sense to mean forced requisition of military supplies; this most often took the form of cartage, a lord's right to demand wagons for military transport.

Because corvée labour for agriculture tended to be demanded by the lord at exactly the same time as the peasants needed to attend to their own plots – e.g. planting and harvest – the corvée was an object of serious resentment. By the 16th century its use in agricultural settings was on the wane; it became increasingly replaced by money payments for labour. It nevertheless persisted in many areas of Europe until the French Revolution and beyond. The word survives in modern usage, meaning any kind of "inevitable or disagreeable chore".

History

Egypt

From the Egyptian Old Kingdom (c. 2613 BC) onward, (the 4th Dynasty), corvée labour helped in 'government' projects; during the times of the Nile River floods, labour was used for construction projects such as pyramids, temples, quarries, canals, roads, and other works.

The 1350 BC Amarna letters, mostly addressed to the pharaoh of Ancient Egypt, have one short letter on the topic of corvée labour. Of the 382 Amarna letters, there is an example of an undamaged letter from Biridiya of Megiddo, entitled "Furnishing corvée workers". (See the City of Nuribta).

In later Egyptian times, during the Ptolemaic dynasty, Ptolemy V, in his Rosetta Stone Decree of 196 BC, listed 22 accomplishments for being honored and the ten rewards granted to him for his accomplishments. The last reward listed is his making of the Rosetta Stone (the Decree of Memphis (Ptolemy V)), in three scripts, to be displayed to the public in the temples (two near complete copies).

One of the shorter accomplishments listed near the middle of the list,

The statement implies it was a common practice.

Until the late 19th century, many of the Egyptian Public Works, including the Suez Canal, were built using corvée labour.

Corvée labor in Egypt ended after 1882. The British Empire took control of Egypt in 1882 and opposed forced labor on principle, but they postponed abolition until Egypt had paid off its foreign debts. It disappeared as Egypt modernised after 1860. During the 19th century corvée had expanded into a national program. It was favoured for temporary projects such as building irrigation works and dams. However, Nile Delta landowners replaced it with cheap temporary labor recruited from Upper Egypt. As a result, corvée was used only in scattered locales, and even then there was peasant resistance. It disappeared by the 1890s.

Austria, Holy Roman Empire, and Germany
Corvée labour (specifically, socage) was essential in the feudal economic system of the Habsburg monarchy – later Austrian Empire – and most German states that have belonged to the Holy Roman Empire. Farmers and peasants were obliged to do hard agricultural work for their nobility, typically six months of the year. When a cash economy became established, the duty was gradually replaced by the duty to pay taxes.

After the Thirty Years' War, the demands for corvée labour grew too high and the system became dysfunctional. The official decline of corvée is linked to the abolition of serfdom by Joseph II, Holy Roman Emperor and Habsburg ruler, in 1781. Corvée labour continued to exist, however, and was only abolished during the revolutions of 1848, along with the legal inequality between the nobility and common people.

Bohemia (or the Czech lands) were a part of the Holy Roman Empire as well as the Habsburg monarchy and corvée labour itself was called  in Czech. In Russian and other Slavic languages,  denotes any work but in Czech, it specifically refers to unpaid unfree work, corvée labour, serf labor, or drudgery. The word  turned out to be optimal for Czech writer Karel Čapek who, after a recommendation by his brother Josef Čapek, introduced the word robot for (originally anthropomorphic) machines that do unpaid work for their owners in his 1920 play R.U.R..

France
In France the corvée existed until 4 August 1789, shortly after the beginning of the French Revolution, when it was abolished along with a number of other feudal privileges of the French landlords. In these later times it was usually directed mainly towards improving the roads. It was greatly resented, and is considered an important cause of the Revolution. Counterrevolution revived the corvée in France, in 1824, 1836, and 1871, under the name ; every able-bodied man had to give three days' labour or its money equivalent in order to be allowed to vote. The corvée also continued to exist  under the seigneurial system in what had been New France, in British North America.

In 1866, during the French occupation of Mexico, the French Army under Marshal François Achille Bazaine set up the corvée to provide labor for public works in place of a system of fines.

Haiti
The independent Kingdom of Haiti based at Cap-Haïtien under Henri Christophe imposed a corvée system of labor upon the common citizenry which was used for massive fortifications to protect against a French invasion. Plantation owners could pay the government and have laborers work for them instead. This enabled the Kingdom of Haiti to maintain a stronger economic structure than the Republic of Haiti based in Port-au-Prince in the South under Alexandre Pétion which had a system of agrarian reform distributing land to the laborers.

After deploying to Haiti in 1915 as an expression of the Roosevelt Corollary to the Monroe Doctrine, the U.S. Armed Forces enforced a corvée system of labor in the interest of making improvements to infrastructure.

Imperial China
Imperial China had a system of conscripting labor from the public, equated to the western corvée by many historians. Qin Shi Huang, the first emperor, and following dynasties imposed it for public works like the Great Wall, the Grand Canal, and the system of national roads and highways.

However, as the imposition was exorbitant and punishment for failure draconian, Qin Shi Huang was resented by the people and criticized by many historians. Corvée labor was effectively abolished following the Ming dynasty.

Inca Empire and modern Peru 
The Inca Empire levied tribute labor through a system called Mit'a which was perceived as a public service to the empire. At its height of efficiency, some subsistence farmers could be called to as many as 300 days of mit'a per year. The Spanish colonial rulers co-opted this system after the Spanish conquest of Peru and turned it into unfree labor for natives forced to work on encomiendas and in silver mines. The Incan system that focused on public works found a comeback during the 1960s government of Fernando Belaúnde Terry as a federal effort, with positive effects on Peruvian infrastructure.

Remnants of the system are still found today in modern Peru, such as the Mink'a communal work that is levied in Andean Quechua communities. An example is the campesino village of Ocra close to Cusco, where each adult is required to perform four days of unpaid labor per month on community projects.

India 
Corvée-style labor ( in Sanskrit) existed in ancient India and lasted until the early twentieth century. The practice is mentioned in the Mahabharata, where forced labor is said to accompany the army. Manu says mechanics and artisans should be made to work for the king one day a month; other writers advocated for one day of work every fortnight (in all Indian lunar calendars, every month is divided into two fortnights, corresponding to the waxing and the waning moons). For poorer citizens, forced labor was seen as a way to pay their taxes since they could not pay ordinary taxes. Citizens, especially skilled workers, were sometimes made to both pay ordinary taxes and work for the state. If called to work, citizens could pay in cash or kind to discharge their obligations in some cases. In the Maurya and post-Maurya time period, forced labor had become a regular source of income for the state. Epigraphic evidence shows rulers granting lands and villages with and without the right to forced labor from workers of those lands.

Japan

Corvée-style labor called  was found in pre-modern Japan.  During the 1930s, it was common practice to import corvée laborers from both China and Korea to work in coal mines. This practice continued until the end of World War II.

Madagascar
France annexed Madagascar as a colony in the late 19th century. Governor-General Joseph Gallieni then implemented a hybrid corvée and poll tax, partly for revenue, partly for labour resources (the French had just abolished slavery there), and partly to move away from a subsistence economy; the last feature involved paying small amounts for the forced labour. This was one attempt at a solution to problems that came up under colonialism. The problems were addressed in a way that was typical of colonialism; that way, and the contemporary thinking behind it, are described in a 1938 work:

The Philippines

The system of forced labor otherwise known as  evolved within the framework of the  system, introduced into the South American colonies by the Spanish government.  in the Philippines refers to 40 days' forced manual labour for men ranging 16 to 60 years of age; these workers built community structures such as churches. In 1884, the required tenure of labour was reduced to 15 days. The system was patterned after the Mexican , selection for forced labour.

Portugal, African colonies
In Portuguese Africa (e.g. Mozambique), the Native Labour Regulations of 1899 stated that all able bodied men must work for six months of every year, and that "They have full liberty to choose the means through which to comply with this regulation, but if they do not comply in some way, the public authorities will force them to comply."

Africans engaged in subsistence agriculture on their own small plots were considered unemployed. The labour was sometimes paid, but in cases of rule violations it was sometimes not—as punishment. The state benefited from the use of the labour for farming and infrastructure, by high income taxes on those who found work with private employers, and by selling corvée labour to South Africa. This system of corvée labour, called , was not abolished in Mozambique until 1962, and continued in some forms until the Carnation Revolution in 1974.

Romanian principalities
In Romania, the corvée was called . Karl Marx describes the corvée system of the Danubian Principalities as a pre-capitalist form of compulsory over-work. The 14 days of labour due to the land-owner – as prescribed by the code of the corvée in the  – actually amounted to 42 days, because the working day was considered the time required for the production of an average daily product, "and that average daily product is determined in so crafty a way that no Cyclops would be done with it in 24 hours." The code of the corvée was supposed to abolish serfdom, but it could not achieve anything in regard to this goal.

A land reform took place in 1864, after the Danubian Principalities became unified and formed The United Principalities of Moldavia and Wallachia, which abolished the corvée and turned the peasants into free proprietors. The former owners were promised compensation, which was to be paid from a fund the peasants had to contribute to for 15 years. Besides the annual fee, the peasants also had to pay for the newly owned land, although at a price below market value. These debts made many peasants return to a life of semi-serfdom.

Russian Empire 

In the Russian Tsardom and the Russian Empire there were a number of permanent corvées called : carriage corvée, coachman corvée, lodging corvée, etc.

In the Black Earth Region, 70% to 77% of the serfs performed ; the rest paid levies.

North America
Corvée was used in several states and provinces in North America especially for road maintenance and this practice persisted to some degree in the United States and Canada. Its popularity with local governments gradually waned after the American Revolution with the increasing development of the monetary economy. After the American Civil War, some Southern states, with money in short supply, commuted taxing their inhabitants with obligations in the form of labor for public works, or let them pay a fee or tax to avoid it. The system proved unsuccessful because of the poor quality of work; in 1894, the Virginia Supreme Court ruled that corvée violated the state constitution, and in 1913 Alabama became among the last states to abolish it.

Modern instances
The government of Myanmar is well known for its use of the corvée and has defended the practice in its official newspapers.

In Bhutan, the  calls for citizens to do work, such as dzong construction, in lieu of part of their tax obligation to the state.

In Rwanda, the centuries-old tradition of umuganda, or community labor, still continues, usually in the form of one Saturday a month when citizens are required to perform this work.

Vietnam maintains corvée for females (ages 18–35) and males (ages 18–45) of 10 days yearly for public works at the discretion of the authorities. This is termed labor duty. However in 2006, the Standing Committee of the National Assembly has voided the decree, effectively abolishing corvée in Vietnam.

The British overseas territory of Pitcairn Islands, which has a population of about 50 and no income or sales tax, has a system of "public work" whereby all able-bodied people are required to perform, when called upon, jobs such as road maintenance and repairs to public buildings.

Since the mid-late 19th century, most countries have restricted corvée labour to conscription (military or civilian service), or prison labour.

Gallery

See also

 Community service
 Penal labor in the United States
 Alternative civilian service
 Civil conscription
 Compulsory Border Guard Service
 Compulsory Fire Service
 Hand and hitch-up services
 Impressment
 Indenture
 Indigénat for instances of corvée in French colonial Africa
 Mit'a
 Nuribta (corvée letter to pharaoh)
 Serjeanty
 Socage
 Subbotnik
 Tax farming
 National Service
 Workfare

References

Bibliography
 See the chapter on "Corvées: valeur symbolique et poids économique" (5 articles on France, Germany, Italy, Spain and England), in: Bourin (Monique) ed., Pour une anthropologie du prélèvement seigneurial dans les campagnes médiévales (XIe–XIVe siècles): réalités et représentations paysannes, Publications de la Sorbonne, 2004, p. 271–381.
 The Rosetta Stone by E. A. Wallis Budge, (Dover Publications), c 1929, Dover edition (unabridged), c 1989.

Unfree labour
Feudal duties
Labor history